William Kennon may refer to:
 William Kennon Jr. (1802–1867), lawyer, judge, and a U.S. Representative from Ohio, cousin of William Kennon Sr.
 William Kennon Sr. (1793–1881), U.S. Representative from Ohio, cousin of William Kennon Jr.

See also 
 William Kennon Mayo (1824–1900), United States Navy officer